Nathaniel Allen (1780 – December 22, 1832) was  an American politician, and a United States representative from New York.

Biography
Nathaniel Allen was born the second son of Moses and Chloe Ward Allen in what is now East Bloomfield, Ontario County, New York before the town was established. He attended the common schools. He married Hilzibeth Akin and they had four children, Nathaniel, John, Hilzebeth, and Almira. His wife, Hilzebth died in 1826.

Career
Allen worked as a blacksmith at Canandaigua, New York before he started his own blacksmith shop at Richmond, near Allens Hill in 1796. He appointed postmaster in Honeoye Falls on July 1, 1811. He was commissioner and paymaster on the Niagara frontier in 1812, and was a militia officer during the War of 1812 as was his Brother Peter Buell Allen. He served as a New York Assemblyman in 1812. He was Sheriff of Ontario County. New York from 1814 to 1819.

Elected as a Democratic-Republican to the 16th United States Congress for one term, Allen served as U.S. Representative for the twenty-first district of New York from March 4, 1819 – March 4, 1821.

Not a candidate for renomination in 1820, Allen was Supervisor of the Town of Richmond. He engaged in the prosecution of claims for money due in connection with the construction of the Louisville & Portland Canal.

Death
Allen died in the Galt House hotel, while conducting business in Louisville, Kentucky, on December 22, 1832 (age about 52 years). He is interred at Allens Hill Cemetery, Richmond, New York.

References

External links

 Political graveyard

1780 births
1832 deaths
People from East Bloomfield, New York
American blacksmiths
New York (state) postmasters
Sheriffs of Ontario County, New York
Town supervisors in New York (state)
Democratic-Republican Party members of the United States House of Representatives from New York (state)
19th-century American politicians